Stockholm Township is a township in Crawford County, Iowa, USA.  As of the 2000 census, its population was 231.

Geography
According to the USGS, it contains two cemeteries: Kiron and Saint Johns Lutheran.

The streams of Newcom Creek, Porter Creek, Trinkle Creek, Tucker Creek and Wheeler Creek run through this township.

References
 USGS Geographic Names Information System (GNIS)

External links
 US-Counties.com
 City-Data.com

Townships in Crawford County, Iowa
Townships in Iowa